Polish nationalism is a form of nationalism which asserts that the Poles are a nation and promotes the cultural unity of Poles. Norman Davies, in the context of Polish nationalism, generally defined nationalism as "a doctrine ... to create a nation by arousing people's awareness of their nationality, and to mobilize their feelings into a vehicle for political action".

The old Polish proto-nationalism of the Polish–Lithuanian Commonwealth which was based on its population's Polish-Lithuanian identity was multi-ethnic and multi-religious, though ethnic Poles still constituted the majority of the population and Roman Catholicism was still the most dominant religion inside the nation. The nationalist ideology which developed soon after the Partitions was initially free of any kind of "ethnic nationalism." It was a Romantic movement which sought the restoration of the Polish sovereign state. Polish Romantic nationalism was described by Maurycy Mochnacki as "the essence of the nation" no longer defined by borders but by ideas, feelings, and thoughts resulting from the past. The birth of modern nationalism under foreign rule was coincided with the November Uprising of 1830 and the subsequent Spring of Nations. However, the defeat suffered by the Poles also broke the Polish revolutionary spirit. Many intellectuals turned to social Darwinism of Herbert Spencer, blaming the Romantic philosophy for the loss of their property, mass destruction, and ultimately the loss of the nation. With the advent of Positivism between 1860 and 1890 Polish nationalism became an elitist cause. Because the partitioning powers could not have identified themselves with the Polish nation, the ideology became more restrictive in terms of ethnicity and religion.

History
The earliest manifestations of Polish nationalism, and conscious discussions of what it means to be a citizen of the Polish nation, can be traced back to the 17th or 18th century, with some scholars going as far back as the 13th century, and others to the 16th century. Early Polish nationalism, or protonationalism, was related to the Polish-Lithuanian identity, represented primarily by the Polish nobility (szlachta), and by their cultural values (such as the Golden Freedoms and Sarmatism). It was founded on civic, republican ideas. This early form of Polish nationalism began to fray and transform with the destruction of the Polish state in the partitions of Poland from 1772 to 1795.

Modern Polish nationalism arose as a movement in the late-18th and early-19th centuries amongst Polish activists who promoted a Polish national consciousness while rejecting cultural assimilation into the dominant cultures of Austria, Prussia and Russia, the three empires which partitioned Poland-Lithuania and occupied the various regions of Poland. This was the consequence of Polish statelessness, because the Polish nationality was suppressed by the authorities of the countries which acquired the territory of the former Commonwealth. During that time Polishness begun to be identified with ethnicity, increasingly excluding groups such as the Polish Jews, who had previously been more likely to be accepted as Polish patriots. This was also the period in which Polish nationalism, which was previously common to both left-wing and right-wing political platforms, became more redefined as being limited to the right-wing, with the emergence of the politician Roman Dmowski (1864-1939), who renamed Liga Polska (the Polish League) as Liga Narodowa (the National League) in 1893.

Polish nationalism reached its height in the second half of the 19th century and in the first half of the 20th century. Crucial waves followed the Polish defeat in the January Uprising of 1864, the restoration of an independent Polish state in 1918 and the establishment of a homogeneous ethnic Polish state in 1945.

An important element of Polish nationalism has been its identification with the Roman Catholic religion, though this is a relatively recent development, with its roots in the counter-reformation of the 17th century, and one which became clearly established in the interwar period. Although the old Commonwealth was religiously diverse and highly tolerant, the Roman Catholic religious narrative with messianic undertones (the Christ of Nations) became one of the defining characteristics of the modern Polish identity. Roman Dmowski, a Polish politician of that era, was vital in defining that concept, and has been called the "father of Polish nationalism".

The post-World War II human migrations from 1945, with the resultant demographic and territorial changes of Poland that drastically reduced the number of ethnic minorities in Poland, also played a major role in the creation of the modern Polish state and nationality.

In communist Poland (1945-1989), the regime adopted, modified and used for its official ideology and propaganda some of the nationalist concepts developed by Dmowski. As Dmowski's National Democrats strongly believed in a "national" (ethnically homogeneous) state, even if this criterion necessitated a reduced territory, their territorial and ethnic ideas were accepted and practically implemented by the Polish communists, acting with Joseph Stalin's permission. Stalin himself in 1944-45 conferenced with and was influenced by a leading National Democrat Stanisław Grabski, coauthor of the planned border and population shifts and an embodiment of the nationalist-communist collusion.

Polish nationalism, together with pro-American liberalism, played an important part in the development of Solidarity movement in the 1980s. Polish irredentism keeps alive memories of Polish presence in the Kresy - the "Eastern Borderlands" formerly under Polish governance and now part of Lithuania, Belarus and Ukraine.

In current Polish politics, Polish nationalism is most openly represented by parties linked in the Liberty and Independence Confederation coalition.  the Confederation, composed of several smaller parties, had 11 deputies (under 7%) in the Sejm.

Parties

Current
Confederation of Independent Poland (1979–present)
National Revival of Poland (1981–present)
National Party (1989–present)
Self-Defence of the Republic of Poland (1992–present)
National Radical Camp (1933–1934, 1935–1939, 1993–present)
National-Catholic Movement (1997–present)
Party of Regions (2007–present)
National League (2007–present)
Forward Poland (2008–present)
National Movement (2012–present)
United Poland (2012–present)
Free and Solidary (2016–present)
Confederation Liberty and Independence (2018–present)

Former
National Democracy (1886–1947)
National-Democratic Party (1897–1919)
Popular National Union (1919–1928)
Camp of Great Poland (1926–1933)
National Party (1928–1947)
Polish United Worker's Party (1948-1990)
Christian National Union (1989–2010)
Movement for Reconstruction of Poland (1995–2012)
League of Polish Families (2001–present) (changed ideology in 2010)
Polish National Party (2004–2014)

See also
 Politics in Poland
 Polonization
 Anti-Polish sentiment
 Polish national songs

Further reading

Denis Clark. 2019. "Poland in the ‘Paris system’: self- determination, stereotypes, and decisions in 1919." Nations and Nationalism. 
 Nationalism on the rise in Poland?, Polskie Radio, 27 Feb 2013
 Punching for Poland: Polish nationalism, The Economist, Nov 12th 2012
 Polish nationalism resurgent, BBC, 9 May 2006
 Nationalism and Communism in Poland, Foreign Affairs, 1962
 Paul Brykczynski, A Poland for the Poles? Józef Piłsudski and the Ambiguities of Polish Nationalism, PRAVO North American Journal for Central European Studies 1 (1), 2007, p. 1-20

References

 
Political history of Poland
Anti-German sentiment in Europe
Antisemitism in Poland